Månegarm is a Swedish Viking/black/folk metal band from Norrtälje. Its name is derived from Mánagarmr, a wolf in Norse mythology.

History 
The band was formed by Svenne Rosendal, Jonas Almqui, and Pierre Wilhelmsson in 1995. After finding another guitarist (Mårten Matsson) and a drummer (Erik Grawsiö), they began rehearsing as "Antikrist". By 1996, they had changed their name to Månegarm, after the wolf of Norse legend, apt for a band concentrating on Viking metal, and early that year, they began recording their first demo collection, Vargaresa (Wolf's Journey). After the recording, Rosendal and Matsson left to be replaced by Jonny Wranning (vocals) and Markus Andé (guitar).

With a second demo, Ur Nattvindar, folk metal became part of their sound, including violins and female vocals for the first time, and they were signed by Displeased Records. Soon afterwards, Wranning left the band and was replaced by Viktor Hemgren. At the end of the year, they went back into Sunlight studios to record their first full-length album, Nordstjärnans Tidsålder (The Age of the Northstar).

In 2000, they began recording their next album, Havets Vargar. Because of some difficulty with the recording studio, they took some time off from recording the album, during which, Viktor Hemgren was fired. Grawsiö took over as vocalist along with his drumming. Also during this time, Janne Liljekvist was added as a full member. With the line up now set, they finished recording the album and released it in 2000.

The band's two demos were remastered and released as an album in 2004, with a fourth studio album, Vredens Tid (Age of Wrath), issued in 2005, followed by performances on the European festival circuit that summer. After one further EP on Displeased, a completely acoustic folk music EP, Urminnes Hävd (The Forest Sessions), the band moved to the Swedish label Black Lodge, which issued the group's sixth album, Vargstenen (Wolf Stone) in 2007.

A new album called Nattväsen was released on 22 October 2009, by Regain Records.

At the end of June/beginning of July 2013 (dates vary depending on territory) they released a new album, Legions of the North, through Napalm Records.

Members

Current 
 Markus Andé – guitar (1996–present)
 Erik Grawsiö – drums (1996–2008), vocals (2000–present), bass (2010–present)
 Jacob Hallegren – drums (2008–present)

Touring members 
 Martin Björklund – guitar, violin (2015–present)
 Tobias Rydsheim – guitar (2016–present)

Former 
 Svenne Rosendal – vocals (1995–1996)
 Jonny Wranning – vocals (1996)
 Georgios "Gogge" Karalis – vocals (1997)
 Viktor Hemgren – vocals (1997–1999)
 Mårten Matsson – guitars (1995–1996), vocals (1996)
 Pierre Wilhelmsson – bass guitar (1995–2010)
 Jan Liljekvist – cello, flute, violin (2004–2012)
 Jonas "Rune" Almquist – guitars (1995–2016)

Timeline

Discography

Albums 

Rereleased albums

Compilation

EPs 
2006: Urminnes hävd (The Forest Sessions)

Rereleased

Single 
2007: "Genom världar nio"
2022: En snara av guld

Demos 
1996: Vargaresa
1997: Ur Nattvindar

References

External links 
 Official website

Swedish viking metal musical groups
Swedish black metal musical groups
Musical groups established in 1995